Guadalupe station (also known as Guadalupe–Santa Maria) is an Amtrak train station in the city of Guadalupe, California. It is served by two daily round trips of the Pacific Surfliner.

Service to the station began in July 1998.  A new station was built to replace the former structure, which was demolished around 1974. The new station was built in a Spanish Colonial Revival style featuring a barrel red-tiled roof and white stuccoed walls, similar to that of older train stations in Southern California. The San Diegan was renamed Pacific Surfliner in 2000.

References

External links 

Trainweb USA Rail Guide: Guadalupe/Santa Maria, CA

Amtrak stations in Santa Barbara County, California
Amtrak Thruway Motorcoach stations in Santa Barbara County, California
Railway stations in the United States opened in 1998